Nīkrāce Parish is an administrative unit of Kuldīga Municipality in the Courland region of Latvia. The parish has a population of 710 (as of 1/07/2010) and covers an area of 130.51 km².

Villages of Nīkrāce parish 
 Dzelda
 Lēnas
 Maznīkrāce
 Nīkrāce
 Vormsāte

Parishes of Latvia
Kuldīga Municipality
Courland